Justo José Herrera (born 1789 in Tegucigalpa, death date unknown) was a Honduran politician that served as president from May 28, 1837 to September 3, 1838. He played a part in separating Honduras from the Federal Republic of Central America by approving a Declaration of independence passed by the Assembly of Honduras.

See also 

 List of presidents of Honduras
 José María Martinez Salinas

References 

Honduran politicians
1789 births
People from Francisco Morazán Department
Year of death missing